The 2020 Scottish Women's Premier League Cup was the 18th edition of the SWPL Cup competition, which began in 2002. It was known as the Scottish Building Society Scottish Women's Premier League Cup for sponsorship reasons. The competition was to be contested by all 18 teams of the two divisions of the Scottish Women's Premier League (SWPL 1 and SWPL 2).

Due to the COVID-19 pandemic, the competition was halted in March and abandoned in July 2020 without a winner.

Format
In a change to the format, the first and second teams in the 2019 Scottish Women's Premier League received a bye to the quarter-finals. The remaining teams in SWPL1 and SWPL2 were divided into four groups of four teams. The group winners and the two runners-up with the best records would advance to the quarter-finals. The two other runners-up along with the teams who finish third and the two fourth-placed teams with the best record would compete in the plate competition.

After the start of the COVID-19 pandemic, the Scottish FA banned the traditional practice of shaking hands between opponents and the match officials in a bid to help contain the virus.

Teams

Notes

Group stage

Group A

Table

Matches

Group B

Table

Matches

Group C

Table

Matches

Group D

Table

Matches

Ranking of second-placed teams

Ranking of fourth-placed teams

Notes

Knock-out phase
Confirmed clubs:

The draw for the quarter-finals was scheduled for Tuesday 17 March 2020 with the ties due to be played on Sunday 29 March 2020.

SWPL Plate
Confirmed clubs:

The draw for the Plate quarter-finals was scheduled for Tuesday 17 March 2020 with the ties due to be played on Sunday 29 March 2020.

References

External links
SWPL Cup at Soccerway

Scottish Women's Premier League Cup
SWPL Cup
Scottish Women's Premier League Cup, 2020